Philip Sherard may refer to:

Philip Sherard (MP) (1623–1695), Member of Parliament for Rutland
Philip Sherard, 2nd Earl of Harborough (1680–1750)
Lt-Gen. Philip Sherard (d. 1790), Guards officer during the Seven Years' War
Philip Sherard, 5th Earl of Harborough (1767–1807)
Philip Sherard, 9th Baron Sherard (1804–1886)
Philip Sherard, 11th Baron Sherard (1851–1924)

See also
Philip Sherrard, British author and philosopher